HTFC may refer to one of the following English football clubs:
 Halifax Town A.F.C.
 Halstead Town F.C.
 Harlow Town F.C.
 Harrogate Town F.C.
 Havant Town F.C.
 Hednesford Town F.C.
 Hertford Town F.C.
 Higham Town F.C.
 Hitchin Town FC
 Horley Town F.C.
 Hucknall Town F.C.
 Huddersfield Town F.C.
 Huntingdon Town F.C.